The Dubai Sevens was played annually as part of the IRB Sevens World Series for international rugby sevens (seven-a-side version of rugby union). The 2010 competition was held on December 3 and December 4 at The Sevens.
It was the first of eight events in the 2010–11 IRB Sevens World Series.

This was the third edition of the Dubai Sevens to be held at The Sevens. Previous editions were held at the Dubai Exiles Rugby Ground.

This was the final tournament for the host Arabian Gulf team. Following the tournament, the team and its governing body, the Arabian Gulf Rugby Football Union, disbanded in order to facilitate a major reorganisation of the sport in the region. As announced by the International Rugby Board in 2009, the AGRFU is being replaced by new national governing bodies in each of the union's member countries.

Format
The tournament consisted of four round-robin pools of four teams. All sixteen teams progressed to the knockout stage. The top two teams from each group progressed to quarter-finals in the main competition, with the winners of those quarter-finals competed in cup semi-finals and the losers competed in plate semi-finals. The bottom two teams from each group progressed to quarter-finals in the consolation competition, with the winners of those quarter-finals competed in bowl semi-finals and the losers competed in shield semi-finals.

Teams
All 16 teams from the 2009 Dubai Sevens were invited to participate in the 2010 tournament:

Pool stages

Pool A

Pool B

Pool C

Pool D

Knockout

Shield

Bowl

Plate

Cup

References

External links
 IRB Sevens
 Dubai Sevens on irb.com

2010
2010–11 IRB Sevens World Series
2010 in Emirati sport
2010 in Asian rugby union